Helena Pilejczyk (née Majcher; born 1 April 1931) is a Polish speed skater. Pilejczyk was the Olympic bronze medal winner in the 1,500 m in Squaw Valley (1960). Her first appearance at the Polish national Championships speed skating was in 1953, while the last time she could be seen skating internationally was during the masters games of 2002, where she competed in the category for female skaters 70 years and above.
She achieved 40 Polish skating records and won 37 Polish titles for distance, allround and relay race events.

Results

Personal records

References
Notes

Bibliography

 Eng, Trond and Koolhaas, Marnix. National All Time & Encyclopedia, Men/Ladies as at 1.7.1986. Issue No.5 "Eastern Europe". Degernes, Norway: WSSSA-Skøytenytt, 1986.
 Żemantowski, Jacek. Lyżwiarski Jubileusz: 80 lat Polski Związek Lyżwiarstwa Szybkiego. Warszawa, Poland: PZLS, 2001.
 Zieleśkiewicz, Władysław. Encyklopedia sportów zimowych. Warszawa, Poland: Wydawnictwo Naukowe PWN, 2001. .

External links
 
 
 Helena Pilejczyk at mosir.elblag.eu 

1931 births
Living people
Polish female speed skaters
Olympic speed skaters of Poland
Olympic bronze medalists for Poland
Speed skaters at the 1960 Winter Olympics
Speed skaters at the 1964 Winter Olympics
Olympic medalists in speed skating
People from Żuromin County
Medalists at the 1960 Winter Olympics
Knights of the Order of Polonia Restituta
Sportspeople from Masovian Voivodeship